The Bradley Braves men's soccer team represents Bradley University, located in Peoria, Illinois, United States, in NCAA Division I soccer competition. They compete in the Missouri Valley Conference. The team last played in the NCAA tournament in 2013, when they advanced to the second round, defeating Northwestern before losing at California. The Braves are currently coached by Jim DeRose.

Year-to-year records

References

External links
 

 
Association football clubs established in 1987
1987 establishments in Illinois